Mexico Octagon Barn is a historic octagon-shaped barn located at Mexico in Oswego County, New York.   It is a wood frame one story structure with a fieldstone foundation built about 1880.

It was listed on the National Register of Historic Places in 1991.

References

Barns on the National Register of Historic Places in New York (state)
Octagon barns in the United States
Infrastructure completed in 1880
Buildings and structures in Oswego County, New York
National Register of Historic Places in Oswego County, New York